Harvard Model Congress (HMC) is the largest congressional simulation conference in the world. HMC provides high school students from across the United States and abroad an opportunity to experience American government firsthand. Although HMC is run entirely by Harvard undergraduates, it is a 501(c)(3) non-profit organization operated independently of the university.

Domestic Conferences

Harvard Model Congress Boston, founded in 1986, is the oldest of the HMC conferences and is held annually in downtown Boston. Each February, nearly 1,500 delegates travel to Boston to handle important issues facing the nation at the time of the conference. Students assume roles in committees in the three branches of the United States government. Programs include committees acting as the House of Representatives, Senate, and Supreme Court as well as other functions associated with government like lobbying.

Founded in 2001, Harvard Model Congress San Francisco is an American government simulation program based on the Boston model and the first conference of its type on the West Coast.  The four-day conference, held in the San Francisco Financial District, is more intimate than the Boston conference and features a lower student-staff ratio and more individual attention from Harvard undergraduates. The conference was originally located in San Diego and subsequently moved to San Francisco, where it continues today.

International Conferences

Harvard Model Congress Middle East, formerly known as Harvard Model Congress Dubai, was founded in 2013. Harvard Model Congress Dubai 2013 took place at the American University in Dubai, UAE from January 24–26. It hosted over 300 students from 11 different countries in its first conference.

Harvard Model Congress Asia was founded in 2004, holding an annual conference in mid-January (second weekend of January). HMC Asia was organized in Hong Kong for the first time in history in 2014. It then became the largest international Model Congress conference, attracting nearly 600 students from 19 countries and 4 continents. HMC Asia focuses on America's political system and international governmental institutions. The 2008 conference, supposed to be held from September 4–6, was cancelled due to rebellion in Thailand. As the substitution for the cancelled 2008 HMCA, the 2009 session of Harvard Model Congress Asia was held in Seoul, Republic of Korea from January 22–24. In 2020, HMCA moved to Tokyo, Japan for the first time in its history. In 2021 and 2022, in response to the COVID-19 pandemic, HMCA was hosted entirely virtually. In 2023, HMCA will return to Seoul, South Korea for its first in-person conference since the pandemic. 

Harvard Model Congress Europe was founded in 1987 and holds an annual conference in mid-March. Although it simulates American government with six congressional committees and several US government special programs, HMC Europe also looks at institutions of international governance, including (among others) the World Health Organization, Group of 24, and European Commission. HMC Europe 2020 was canceled due to the Coronavirus pandemic, and the 2021 conference will be hosted virtually.

Harvard Model Congress Latin America was founded in 2014, holding an annual conference near the end of August. The first HMC Latin America took place at São Paulo, Brazil from August 21–24 at Centro Universitário Belas Artes de São Paulo. Although it mainly simulates American government, HMC Latin America also includes committees specifically relevant to Latin America such as the Organization of American States and the Presidential Cabinet of Brazil. The final HMC Latin America was held in Mexico City, Mexico in 2018.

In all international conferences, students discuss and debate international issues from a more global perspective, formulating policy firsthand. The structured committee settings expose them to the realities of the democratic process, challenging them to forge compromise while advancing the interests of their constituency. The conferences seek to provide an unparalleled educational experience for talented secondary school students from around the world, offering hundreds of students each year an exciting opportunity to practice public speaking and policy writing. The conferences accommodate students with varying degrees of English ability, and the global diversity of participants and staff offers delegates the unique opportunity to approach challenging issues from numerous different perspectives.

Harvard Model Congress Boston History

Harvard Model Congress Asia History

Harvard Model Congress Europe History

Harvard Model Congress San Francisco History

Harvard Model Congress Middle East History

Harvard Model Congress Latin America History

Logistics
Harvard Model Congress is one of the largest Harvard student organizations, and each year around 200 Harvard undergraduates assist with planning and running the conferences.

As soon as one Harvard Model Congress conference ends, planning for the subsequent such conference begins. For the Boston conference, topics for debate must be chosen by May so that briefing books can be prepared over the summer and distributed by early fall, in time to allow delegates to begin intensively researching each committee's topics for debate. Updates to briefings are written and distributed to schools by winter, and issue summaries are also provided to the delegates. HMC 2009 was HMC's first-ever paperless conference. For the duration of the event each year, Harvard Model Congress uses essentially all of the conference space available at the Boston Sheraton. Although most of the written work during the actual weekend of the event is done by the delegates, the staff continues to provide programmatic direction and manages all operations throughout the duration of the conference.

External links
 Harvard's website
 Official HMC website
 Official HMC Boston website
 Official HMC San Francisco website
 Official HMC Asia website
 Official HMC Europe website
 Official HMC Dubai website
 Official HMC Latin America website

Harvard University
Charities based in Massachusetts
International non-profit organizations
Conferences in the United States
Youth model government
Organizations established in 1986
1986 establishments in Massachusetts
Youth organizations based in Massachusetts